The 1973 Belgian Grand Prix was a Formula One motor race held at Zolder on 20 May 1973. It was race 5 of 15 in both the 1973 World Championship of Drivers and the 1973 International Cup for Formula One Manufacturers. The race was won by British driver Jackie Stewart driving a Tyrrell 006.

The entire Zolder track had to be resurfaced a week before the actual Grand Prix after a few drivers such as Jackie Stewart, Emerson Fittipaldi and François Cevert walked around the track to inspect it. They found that the track started to break up as a result of a previous race, and the track owners immediately decided to resurface the track, only a week before the Grand Prix. Cevert, Fittipaldi and Stewart refused to drive on the track because of the danger, and Cevert responded to the FIA that they would attempt to cancel the race if the owners did not do a good enough job of fixing the track.

Future world champion Niki Lauda took his first ever career points here, by finishing in fifth place in his BRM.

This race saw the end of teams' numbers changing from race to race - the numbers teams raced with at Zolder lasted until the end of the season. For the 1974 season, the finishing positions in the Constructors' Championship were used to allocate the numbers, after which teams did not change numbers unless they won the Drivers' Championship (or signed the current World Champion).

Qualifying

Qualifying classification

Race

Classification

Championship standings after the race

Drivers' Championship standings

Constructors' Championship standings

Note: Only the top five positions are included for both sets of standings.

References

Belgian Grand Prix
Belgian Grand Prix
European Grand Prix
Grand Prix
Circuit Zolder
May 1973 sports events in Europe